Alain Polaniok (19 September 1958 – 12 September 2005) was a French footballer who played as a midfielder.

External links
Profile at Afterfoot.fr

1958 births
2005 deaths
People from Givet
Association football midfielders
AS Cannes players
CS Sedan Ardennes players
FC Metz players
French football managers
French footballers
Ligue 1 players
Ligue 2 players
Paris Saint-Germain F.C. players
Red Star F.C. players
Stade Lavallois players
Stade de Reims players
Tours FC players
Sportspeople from Ardennes (department)
Footballers from Grand Est
French people of Polish descent